Segundo Frente (Spanish for "Second Front") is a municipality in the Santiago de Cuba Province of Cuba. Located in the northern part of the province, it is centered on the town, and municipal seat, of Mayarí Arriba.

Geography
The municipality is located north of the province, neighboring the provinces of Holguín and Guantánamo; and is partly included into Sierra Cristal National Park's territory. It borders with the municipalities of Mayarí, Frank País, Sagua de Tánamo, El Salvador, Songo-La Maya and San Luis.

It includes the town of Mayarí Arriba and the villages of Boca de Micara, Loma Blanca, Sabanilla, San Benito de Mayarí, Soledad and Tumba Siete.

Demographics
In 2004, the municipality of Segundo Frente had a population of 40,885.

See also
List of cities in Cuba
Municipalities of Cuba

References

External links

 Segundo Frente on EcuRed

Populated places in Santiago de Cuba Province